Edward Duncan Ernest Gould, (28 October 1988 – 25 March 2012) was a British animator, artist, and voice actor. He was best known for creating Eddsworld, a media franchise consisting of flash animations and web comics featuring fictionalised versions of himself and longtime collaborators Thomas Ridgewell, Matt Hargreaves, Tord Larrson and others. After Gould's death in 2012, production of Eddsworld was passed on to Ridgewell and later Hargreaves.

Early life
Edd Gould was born on 28 October 1988 in Isleworth, Greater London to Susan Gould and Duncan Gould. He had a sister and a brother. He attended the Orleans Park School as depicted in his first Newgrounds entry "Edd", and met Matt Hargreaves during a sports day event there. Gould drew his friends in his comics and Hargreaves became a prominent part of Eddsworld.

Gould met Tom Ridgewell online, a fan of his work, shortly after he started making stick animations. He likewise met Tord Larsson online. Ridgewell and Larsson were included in the Eddsworld cast along with Hargreaves, appearing in Eddsworld Christmas Special 2004.

Career 
In 2000, Gould began animating using a GIF program to publish on Stick Figure Death Theatre. When the website stopped accepting GIFs, Gould spent seven months learning Macromedia Flash, helped by Lavalle Lee. Gould published his first animation on Stick Figure Death Theatre or Stick Suicide called “Bendee 1” on November 7, 2002. Gould made his first Newgrounds entry on 6 June 2003, titled "Edd."

In September 2008 Gould began studying as an independent animator at the University for the Creative Arts in Maidstone. He joined Cake Bomb, a creative media group founded by Ridgewell. He voiced the "I Like Trains" kid in TomSka's "Asdfmovie" series on YouTube, and animated the second episode of Asdfmovie.

Illness and death 
On 16 April 2011, Gould revealed he had been diagnosed with acute lymphoblastic leukemia, a cancer of the white blood cells. It was his second diagnosis, having been previously diagnosed with the same illness on 30 January 2006. He posted a video on YouTube entitled "Edd vs Cancer" featuring himself, Ridgewell, and Hargreaves discussing the diagnosis. He platformed his illness for several sketches on his friends' YouTube accounts.

Gould died from a recurring infection caused by the cancer on the morning of 25 March 2012. He was 23 years old. Ridgewell and Hargreaves announced Gould's death in a short video, "RIP Edd Gould (1988–2012)", two days later. The funeral was held on 10 April at All Saints' Church in Isleworth, where a eulogy compiled from video clips from fans and friends was shown. The last episode he directed for Eddsworld, "Space Face (Part 1)", was released on YouTube on 2 June 2012. Eddsworld production passed to Ridgewell who continued to produce episodes as part of Gould's will. Under Ridgewell's direction, profits went to CLIC Sargent (now Young Lives vs Cancer), a UK cancer charity supporting children, young people and their families.

Gould was cremated and buried at Mortlake Crematorium. In April 2012, Hargreaves and Ridgewell attended VidCon in Los Angeles and scattered some of Gould's ashes near the Hollywood Sign.

Filmography

References

External links 
 YouTube channel
 Newgrounds account
 

1988 births
2012 deaths
Flash artists
English animators
English male voice actors
British surrealist artists
People from Isleworth
English YouTubers
Alumni of the University for the Creative Arts
Deaths from acute lymphocytic leukemia
Deaths from cancer in England
People educated at Orleans Park School
YouTube animators